Phleng Rak Pha Puen Taek was a Thai action/drama and music (luk thung style) series or lakorn in western genre, it aired on Channel 7 from July 4 to August 24, 2014 on Fridays, Saturdays and Sundays at 20:20 for 23 episodes.

Plot
Ban Pa Puen Taek  (บ้านผาปืนแตก; Pa Puen Taek village) in 1969–77, the story begins when Shane Phananchoeng, a hot-tempered young man who goes to the border patrol. Until one day Shane returned to his native Ban Pa Puen Taek. He had to face bad news when he realized that Nueathong his lover has to marry a greatest enemy Chart Talumphuk, so he planned to take Nueathong out, but it turns out that Shane kidnapped Wanlapa to replace, the chaos followed.

Cast
Main cast
 Saran Sirilak as Shane Phananchoeng
 Sammy Cowell as Wanlapa
 Ek Rangsiroj as Pleung Phayafai
 Gavintra Photijak as Auemduean
 Nutthawat Plengsiriwat as Chart Talumphuk
 Poolaphat Attapanyapol as Fahlan Kamramsuek
 Athinan Srisaweang as Nueathong
 Jayjintai Untimanon as Yod Diesel
Supporting cast
 Chartchai Ngamsan as Phukong Saman (Captain Saman)
 Surawut Maikun as Kamnan Prab Thongpan
 Atirut Singhaampol as Cherd
 Sirilapas Kongtrakarn as Namkang Yamratree
 Chalermporn Pumpanwong as Kru Prasit (Master Prasit)
 Krung Srivilai as Luang Por Sin (Venerable Father Sin)
 Pamela Bowden as Lamduan
 Pipatpon Komaratat as Laisuea Kamlue
 Janet Keaw as Noi Cha Cha Cha
 Pichet Sriracha as Saen Supparer
 Luafua Mokjok as Jik Trumpet
 Nopparat Thongridsuk as Toon
 Weerachai Hattagowit as Samruay
Cameo appearance
 Kannaporn Puangtong as Fah-ngam
 Sarut Suwanpakdee as Thongsook
 Thanayong Wongtrakun as Phupan Lertyot (Colonel Lertyot)
 Ron Smoorenburg as Tom
 Atiwat Sanitwong Na Ayudhaya as Tan Sombat (Mr. Sombat)

Reception and ratings
When it aired, the response was exceedingly good, and it is the third highest-rated series in 2014 on Channel 7, and there is a call for sequels.

In the tables below, the  represent the highest ratings and the  represent the lowest ratings.

Note: August 10, 2014, no broadcast due to broadcast live FA Community Shield  between Arsenal vs Manchester City from England.

References

External links
  
 Opening theme 
 Ending theme 

Thai television soap operas
2014 Thai television series debuts
2014 Thai television series endings
Thai action television series
Thai music television series
Television series set in the 1960s
Television series set in the 1970s
2010s Western (genre) television series
Channel 7 (Thailand) original programming